Helen C. Evans is an American art historian and curator specializing in Byzantine art.

Evans has worked for the Metropolitan Museum of Art since 1991 and was co-curator along with William D. Wixom of its 1997 exhibition, The Glory of Byzantium: Art and Culture of the Middle Byzantine Era. She became a scholar devoted to the documentation of Byzantine art because according to her, "Byzantine art is underrepresented because Byzantine history slowly disappeared from the way we look at the world. The empire ended at roughly the same moment that Columbus found the New World. When we do an exhibition like Interwoven Globe at the Met, it starts at 1500 and we don't look at the fact that Byzantium was on one of the great trade routes of the previous millennium and a half—or several millennia in fact. Until Columbus, you did not reach the spices of the orient; you did not reach the silks of China, without crossing the Eastern Mediterranean. ...When most academic scholarship really begins, Byzantium has been subsumed in the Ottoman Empire."

In 2018, she curated the exhibition "Armenia!". In 2019 Helen C. Evans was awarded by Friendship Order by the president of Armenia for representing the Armenian Culture to the World in a distinguished way, as well as for the significant contribution to the strengthening and development of the Armenian-American friendly relations.

Publications
 The Glory of Byzantium: Art and Culture of the Middle Byzantine Era, A.D. 843-1261, editor and contributor with William D. Wixom, New York, 1997
 Trésors du monastère de Sainte-Catherine mont Sinaï, Egypte: [Rédigé à l'occasion de l'exposition présentée à la] Fondation Pierre Gianadda, Martigny, Suisse, 5 octobre au 12 décembre 2004, editor, Martigny 2004
 Saint Catherine's Monastery, Sinai, Egypt: A Photographic Essay, editor and contributor, New York, 2004
 Byzantium: Faith and Power (1261-1557), editor and contributor, New York, 2004
 Byzantium and Islam: Age of Transition, 7th-9th Century, editor and contributor with Brandie Ratliff, New York, 2012

References

External links
 The Glory of Byzantium: Art and Culture of the Middle Byzantine Era, A.D. 843–1261, online version of 1997 catalog and reference work
 2018 book award
 2014 book award
 September 2016 interview of Evans as expert in Armenian art, and Mary Carruthers as authority on medieval literature & rhetoric, by Richard Schneider, professor in Hermeneutics and Liturgical Art at Saint Vladimir's Orthodox Theological Seminary

Living people
American art historians
People associated with the Metropolitan Museum of Art
American art curators
American women curators
Women art historians
American women historians
Year of birth missing (living people)
Historians of Byzantine art
Women Byzantinists
Women medievalists
21st-century American women